Suhrawardi or Sohrevardi or variants may refer to:

 Suhrawardiyya, a Sufi order
Abu al-Najib Suhrawardi (1097–1168), founder of the order
Shihab al-Din 'Umar al-Suhrawardi (c. 1145 – 1234), his nephew
 Shahab al-Din Yahya ibn Habash Suhrawardi (1154–1191), Persian philosopher and founder of the Iranian school of Illuminationism
 Huseyn Shaheed Suhrawardy (1892–1963), Bengali politician and lawyer, and prime minister of Pakistan
Zahid Suhrawardy (1870–1949), his father, an Indian Bengali jurist 
 Hasan Shaheed Suhrawardy (1890–1965), his brother, Bengali writer and diplomat
 Ubaidullah Al Ubaidi Suhrawardy (1832–1885), Bengali educationist and writer
 Abdullah Al-Mamun Suhrawardy (1877–1935), his son, Bengali Islamic scholar, barrister, and academic
 Hassan Suhrawardy (1884–1946), his son, Bengali surgeon, military officer, politician, and public official
 Ibrahim Suhrawardy (1896–1972), Indian teacher and linguist
 Nilofar Suhrawardy (fl. from c. 2003), Indian freelance journalist and author
 Begum Badar un nissa Akhtar (1894–1956), Indian social reformer and educator, daughter of Aminuddin Al Amin Suhrawardy

See also

Sohrevard, Iran
Suhrawardy Udyan, a national memorial in Dhaka, Bangladesh